Purkan (also Romanized as Pūrkān) is a village in Adaran Rural District, Asara District, Karaj County, Alborz Province, Iran. At the 2006 census, its population was 360, in 114 families.

References 

Populated places in Karaj County